Golinja is a village in central Croatia, in the municipality of Gvozd, Sisak-Moslavina County. It is connected by the D6 highway.

History

Demographics
According to the 2011 census, the village of Golinja has 38 inhabitants. This represents 14.07% of its pre-war population according to the 1991 census.

According to the 1991 census, 73.33% of the village population were ethnic Serbs (198/270),  26.30% were ethnic Croats (71/270), while 0.37% were of other ethnic origin (1/270).

Notable natives and residents

References

Populated places in Sisak-Moslavina County
Serb communities in Croatia